"Body on Me" is a song by British singer Rita Ora, featuring guest vocals by American recording artist Chris Brown. The song was released on 7 August 2015. There's also a remix called Body on Me (Fetty Wap Remix) it features American rapper and singer Fetty Wap that was released on 25 August 2015

Background and composition
Ora and Brown confirmed their collaboration on 24 July 2015 by posting a still from the song's accompanying music video to their respective Instagram accounts. The song's audio and accompanying artwork were revealed on 6 August, ahead of its release on 7 August 2015. "Body on Me" is a pop and R&B song with a tempo of 89 beats per minute.

Music video
A music video to accompany the release of the song was first released on Vevo on 18 August 2015 at a total length of four minutes and thirty-nine seconds. The music video was directed by Colin Tilley and stars Rita Ora and Chris Brown.In the video we see Rita Ora in her apartment dancing in her shorts and croptop while and in the second scene we see Rita still in her shorts but this time without her croptop whereas she is covering her with a flag and in another scene we see Chris and Rita almost kissing on top of each other. And in the last scene we see Chris knocking on the window asking Rita to dance and she accepts and they go out on the rooftop and dance

Live performances
Ora and Brown performed the song for the first time together during an episode of Jimmy Kimmel Live on 8 September 2015. Ora later performed a solo rendition of the song on Good Morning America on 16 September and in an episode of The Ellen DeGeneres Show which aired on 5 October. Ora included the song as part of a medley with "Poison" and "Trapping Ain't Dead" at the 2015 MOBO Awards, where she was joined onstage by Section Boyz. On 12 November 2015, Ora performed the song as part of medley with "I Will Never Let You Down" at the Bambi Awards 2015.

Track listing
Digital download
"Body on Me" (featuring Chris Brown) – 3:45

Digital download – Fetty Wap Remix
"Body on Me" (Fetty Wap Remix) (featuring Chris Brown and Fetty Wap) – 3:49

Digital download – The Remixes
"Body on Me" (Zac Samuel Remix Edit)– 3:18
"Body on Me" (Dave Audé Tropical Remix) – 4:47
"Body on Me" (Fwdslxsh Remix – 2:42

CD single
"Body on Me" (featuring Chris Brown) – 3:47
"Body on Me" (Fetty Way Remix) (featuring Chris Brown and Fetty Wap) – 3:50

Charts

Certifications

Release history

References

External links

2015 singles
2015 songs
Rita Ora songs
Roc Nation singles
Chris Brown songs
Music videos directed by Colin Tilley
Songs written by Chris Brown
Songs written by James Abrahart
Song recordings produced by the Monsters & Strangerz
Songs written by Tinashe Sibanda
Male–female vocal duets
Songs written by Jordan Johnson (songwriter)
Songs written by Stefan Johnson
Songs written by Marcus Lomax